Mithila Madhya Parikrama ( मिथिला मध्य परिक्रमा ) is an annual periodic journey of the central part of the ancient Mithila. It is held every year between the months of Kartik ( October–November ), Falgun ( February–March ) and Baishakh ( April–May ). But nowadays only Falgun ( February–March ) journey is famous. It is a circular journey of the central part of the Ancient Mithila. It covers a distance of 128 km circular path. It is mentioned in the epic Mithila Mahatmya which was composed in the 18th century.

Description 
According to the third chapter of the epic Mithila Mahatmya there are three Hindu calendar months Kartik ( कार्तिक ), Falgun ( फाल्गुन ) and Baishakh ( बैशाख ) in which this circular journey can be done. It covers circuit path of 128 km distance between India and Nepal both countries. Mithila Parikrama is of three types. They are Brihat Mithila Parikrama, Mithila Madhya Parikrama and Antargrih Parikrama. Brihat Mithila Parikrama covers 84 Kosh distance of ancient Indian distance measuring system, so it is also called as Chaurasi Kosh Parikrama ( चौरासी कोश परिक्रमा ) . It covers area of Mithila near Ganga river, Gandak river, Himalaya and Koshi river. It covers very large distance. Mithila Madhya Parikrama is smaller than the Brihat Mithila Parikrama. It starts from Kachuri village of Dhanusha district of Mithila region in Nepal and traveling the part of Mithila region in India, it ends at Janaki Mandir in Janakpur, Nepal. According to the text, it should be travelled within only five days but the Pandits of Mithila extended the period of time and determined it for 15 days journey, so that the journey for old and disabled people would be easier.  It starts from the day of Amavasya in the Hindu calendar month of Falgun and end on the day of Purnima or the Hindu festival Holi. On the day of Hindu festival Holi, an internal circumambulation of the holy city of Janakpur is also performed by the travellers which is known as Antargrih Parikrama. It covers approximately 8 km long circular path of the city of Janakpur in Nepal. According to sages, it is a world famous circumambulation related to the path of Lord Rama and Goddess Sita in the ancient Mithila Kingdom.

Related Places 
There are 15 major locations in the holy path of Mithila Madhya Parikrama.

  Kachuri: In the early days, the sedan (Dola) of Lord Rama used to start journey from Agnikund located in Janakpur, Nepal for the circumambulation. Agnikund was the place of Yajnsthali of Videha Raj. After the death of Mahant of Agnikund, the Mahant Ram Naresh Sharan of Kachuridham shifted it to Kachuridham. Since then the sedan (Dola) of the Lord Rama started coming out of Kachuridham. This place is in Nepal.
  Hanumangadhi: After leaving the dola from Kachuridham, it first reaches King Janaka's court.  From there, devotees take night rest at Hanumangarhi on the first day with Kishoriji's Dola.  It is believed that in Treta Yuga, Bajrang Bali used to guard the gates of Janakpurdham.  Hence this place is known as Hanumangarhi.
  Kalyaneshwar Sthan is very famous temple near Indo-Nepal border in  Harlakhi block area .  King Janaka had established Kalyaneshwar Mahadev temple at this entrance of ancient Mithila Dham.  The rest of the second day's journey takes place at this place.  The resolution of the journey also takes place at this place.
  Girja Sthan Phulhar is the place where Sita used to come daily to worship goddess Girja.  There was flower garden in which Sita and Lord Rama saw each other for the first time.  Hence the name of this place later became Fulhar ( Phulhar ).
  Matihani is located on the Indo-Nepal border near Madhwapur block. This place is quite famous for Mithila Madhya Parikrama. Soil was brought from this place for Matkor in the marriage ceremony of Mata Sita and Lord Shri Rama. Due to this the place got its name Matihani. Pancheshwar Nath Mahadev Mandir is very famous temple of Lord Shiva near it.
  Jaleshwar Sthan is famous for Lord Shiva temple existing from King Janaka period in Mithila. It was one of the gate of capital city of Mithila.
  Marai Sthan is the place where Marba ( Hut for marriage ceremony in Hinduism) having roof of big dried grass was made for the marriage ceremony of the Lord Rama and Goddess Sita in forest of Mithila.
  Dhurva Kunda is located in Mahottari district of Nepal. This place was the Ashram of Maharshi Dhurva. It is believed that Maharshi Dhurva was a devotee of Lord Vishnu. He performed meditation and turned into a celestial body,  the brightest polar star, “Dhurva-tara”. It is said that Lord Rama, Laxmana and the sage Vishwamitra paid a visit to Dhurva Kunda during Mithila Darshan.

  Kanchanvan is the place where Lord Rama and Sita played their first Holi after the marriage in Mithila. It is presently located in Mahottari district of Nepal.
  Chhireshwar Mahadev Mandir is at Parvata village of Dhanusha district of Nepal. It is believed as the third Shivalinga protecting Mithila. It was built by the King Janaka. It is also known as the meeting point of the five mountains. It is also known as Kshireshwornath.
  Dhanusha is believed as the place where the piece of Shiv-Dhanush (bow), named Pinak fell when Rama tried to use the Dhanush in the Sita-Swayambar. It is located near Janakpur in Nepal.
  Satoshar Sthan is the place related to the Saptrishi Ashram in Mithila. Saptrishi means group of seven great sage in the ancient times. These seven rishis are Agastya, Atri, Bhardwaja, Gautama, Jamadagni, Vashistha, and Vishvamitra. At this ashram the seven sages had met for their philosophical conferences.There is a temple of Lord Shiva known as Satohar Sthan Mahadev Mandir. It is also located in Mithila part of Nepal.
  Karuna  is a village in Madhubani district of Bihar in India. In Mithila, a daughter is offered water to drink before she leaves for the groom’s place and it is believed that Sita was offered water at karuna village.
  Vishwamitra Ashram Visaul, is the ashram of the Indian sage Vishwamitra in Mithila. It is believed that the Ashram was built by the King Janaka for the accommodation of the sage Vishwamitra in Mithila. In this ashram there is a Shivling having four faces around it. The period of the shivling is estimated as of 9th century.
  Janakpur Dham is believed as the capital city of King Sreedhwaja Janaka in Mithila Kingdom.

References 

Mithila
Ramayana